Vadvetjåkka is a Swedish national park in Kiruna Municipality, Norrbotten County.

References

External links
 Sweden's National Parks: Vadvetjåkka National Park from the Swedish Environmental Protection Agency

Geography of Norrbotten County
National parks of Sweden
Protected areas established in 1920
1920 establishments in Sweden
Tourist attractions in Norrbotten County
Lapland (Sweden)